Sheffield Hockey Club is a field hockey club based in Sheffield, South Yorkshire, England. The club is also known as Sheffield Hallam as a result of the partnership with Sheffield Hallam University.

About

The men's 1st XI play in the Men's England Hockey League. The ladies' 1XI play in the North Hockey League. The club fields nine men's sides, five ladies' sides and junior sides based on a range of age groups.

The home ground at Abbeydale Park was established in 1919. There is a water-based pitch and clubhouse adjacent to a rugby and cricket pitch. The water-based pitch's (previously green) turf has been replaced with the donated blue turf that was used for field hockey at the London 2012 Olympics Queen Elizabeth Olympic Park.

Teams

Current Men's 1st Team

Honours
Men
 2017/2018 Yorkshire Cup Runners Up
 2018/2019 Yorkshire Cup Runners Up
 2019/2020 Yorkshire Cup Runners Up

Notable players

Men's internationals

References

English field hockey clubs
1919 establishments in England
Sport in Sheffield
Sport in South Yorkshire
Field hockey in Yorkshire
Sheff